Gyda Enger (born 14 January 1993) is a Norwegian ski jumper, who represents the club Hernes IL.

She made her debut in the Continental Cup, the highest level in women's ski jumping, on 8 March 2006 with a 19th place in Vaaler. She has finished among the top 10 five times.

15 years old in 2008, she was selected for the first Norwegian national team to compete in a World Championship, together with Anette Sagen, Line Jahr and Silje Sprakehaug.

She represented Norway at the 2011 World Championship in Oslo.

References

1993 births
Living people
Norwegian female ski jumpers
People from Hedmark
Olympic ski jumpers of Norway
Ski jumpers at the 2014 Winter Olympics
Sportspeople from Innlandet
21st-century Norwegian women